Bruno Moretti (born 1957) is an Italian composer, pianist, and conductor. He has composed ballet music (as well as theatre, cinema and television music) working in collaboration with the choreographer Mauro Bigonzetti. He is also an accompanist of singers.

Biography
Moretti was born in Rome, and studied initially with Armando Renzi. Then he became Nino Rota’s assistant for the creation of the opera Napoli Milionaria at Spoleto festival in 1977. Later he studied conducting at Siena's Accademia Musicale Chigiana. He made his conducting debut in 1979 at the Teatro dell'Opera di Roma with Madama Butterfly by Giacomo Puccini. He has conducted throughout Italy and in England, Israel, the Far East and North America.

Works

Opera 
 Lady E (1999), opera in two acts to a libretto by Pasquale Plastino and Silvia Ranfagni

Ballet 
Caravaggio (2008), a two-act ballet by Mauro Bigonzetti. Moretti wrote the score based on several works by Claudio Monteverdi. Moretti's interpretation was reviewed as "light ... then darker and always varied in texture ... romanticized Monteverdi, but it fits the stage action perfectly."
 Don Giovanni, emozioni di un mito (1996), for Il Balletto di Toscana
 Comoedia (1998), for Aterballetto
 Vespro (2002), for New York City Ballet  
 In Vento (2006) 
 Oltremare (2008)

Orchestral music 
 Prometeo per orchestra, symphonic poem

Reviews 
Vespro, New York Times, Anna Kisselgoff, May 10, 2002 
Vespro, Village Voice, Deborah Jowitt, May 14, 2002 
In Vento, New York Times, John Rockwell, May 6, 2006 
In Vento, Village Voice, Deborah Jowitt, May 9, 2006
In Vento, New York Observer, Robert Gottlieb, June 4, 2006
In Vento, New York Sun, Joel Lobenthal, May 8, 2006 
Oltremare, New York Times, Alastair Macaulay, January 25, 2008
Oltremare, New York Post, Clive Barnes, January 25, 2008 
Oltremare, New York Sun, Joel Lobenthal, January 25, 2008

References

External links 

Italian ballet composers
Italian composers
Italian male composers
Accademia Nazionale di Santa Cecilia alumni
Accademia Musicale Chigiana alumni
Living people
1957 births
Musicians from Rome